The Bruška massacre took place on 21 December 1991 in Bruška, a small village near the Croatian town of Benkovac when Serbian paramilitaries executed 10 civilians in the hamlet of Marinovići. Nine were members of the Marinović family and one was a Serb neighbor. They were led out of the house after playing cards and shot on the spot by members of a paramilitary group called "Knindže".

Dragan Vasiljković was the commander of this paramilitary group and has been indicted for this crime by the Croatian Ministry of Justice. Vasiljković was arrested in Australia in 2006 and extradited to Croatia in 2015.

See also
List of massacres in Croatia

References

External links
ICTY vs Milan Babic
Government lags on action against war criminals
ICTY vs Milan Babic & Milan Martic

Survivors of Bruška massacre testify in court
'Captain Dragan' seeks extradition review
Captain Dragan loses law challenge

1991 in Croatia
Mass murder in 1991
Massacres in 1991
Serbian war crimes in the Croatian War of Independence
Massacres in Croatia
Republic of Serbian Krajina
December 1991 events in Europe
1991 crimes in Croatia
1991 murders in Europe
1990s murders in Croatia
Massacres of Croats
Massacres in the Croatian War of Independence